In the 1952 Wimbledon Championships – Gentlemen's Singles tennis competition, number one seed Frank Sedgman defeated number two seed Jaroslav Drobný in the final, 4–6, 6–2, 6–3, 6–2 to win the title. Dick Savitt was the defending champion, but lost in the quarterfinals to Mervyn Rose.

Progress of the tournament
Drobný was representing Egypt, having defected from Czechoslovakia in 1949 and been offered Egyptian citizenship in 1950. It was his second Wimbledon men's singles final, and he defeated the number 5 and 6 seeds (Australia's Ken McGregor and the US's Herbie Flam) to get there. Another Australian, number 8 seed Mervyn Rose, having defeated Savitt, was beaten by the eventual champion, Sedgman, in the semifinals.

Seeds

  Frank Sedgman (champion)
  Jaroslav Drobný (final)
  Vic Seixas (quarterfinals)
  Dick Savitt (quarterfinals)
  Ken McGregor (quarterfinals)
  Herbie Flam (semifinals)
  Eric Sturgess (quarterfinals)
  Mervyn Rose (semifinals)
  Art Larsen (first round)
  Gardnar Mulloy (fourth round)
  Ham Richardson (first round)
  Budge Patty (fourth round)

Draw

Finals

Top half

Section 1

Section 2

Section 3

Section 4

Bottom half

Section 5

Section 6

Section 7

Section 8

References

External links

Men's Singles
Wimbledon Championship by year – Men's singles